The Ghulja incident (also referred to as the Ghulja Massacre) was the culmination of the Ghulja protests of 1997, a series of demonstrations in the city of Ghulja (known as Yining (伊宁) in Chinese) in the Xinjiang autonomous region of China (PRC) beginning in early February 1997.

Background
During the 1980s the practice of Meshrep had become increasing popular in Xinjiang amongst Uyghur youth. The cultural practice, which involves music, dance, and poetry, was seen by the state as a positive influence in the region. However, towards the middle of the 1990s the Chinese authorities began to see the Meshrep movement as a threat. In 1996 Abduhelil Abdurahman, a prominent organiser of Meshrep meetings, was jailed and subsequently beaten to death whilst in custody by the authorities in Xinjiang as part of the "Strike Hard" campaign. Meshrep attendees became a primary target of the "Strike Hard" campaign.

Protests
The protests were sparked partly by the news of the execution of 30 Uyghur independence activists. Another cause was the arrest of a group of women taking part in a Meshrep on 3 February 1997, as well as the general crackdown on attempts to revive elements of traditional Uyghur culture, including traditional meshrep gatherings. On 5 February 1997, after two days of protests during which the protesters had marched shouting "God is great" and "independence for Xinjiang" and had reportedly been dispersed using clubs, water cannon, and tear gas, several demonstrators were killed by the Chinese Army gunfire. Official reports put the death toll at 9, while dissident reports estimated the number killed at more than 100 and even as many as 167. Eyewitnesses reported that around 30 people were killed by gunfire, with many hundreds of others being wounded.

Aftermath
Some of the Uyghurs involved in this incident fled from China to Afghanistan and Pakistan, but were detained by the U.S. military and handed over to the Pakistani government during the U.S. invasion of Afghanistan, and were imprisoned in Guantanamo Bay detention camp in Cuba. During incarceration, Chinese officials have visited Guantanamo to participate in interrogations, and the According to U.S. Department of Justice Inspector General Glenn Fine, Chinese officials and U.S. military interrogators also allegedly collaborated on a human rights violation called the "Frequent Flyer Program," which interrupted his sleep every 15 minutes.

According to dissident sources, as many as 1,600 people were arrested on charges of intending to "split the motherland", conducting criminal activity, fundamental religious activity, and counter-revolutionary activities following the crackdown carried out in the years immediately following the incident in Xinjiang, overwhelmingly against Uyghurs. Rebiya Kadeer, who witnessed the Ghulja Incident, went on to become leader of the World Uyghur Congress.

On February 5, 2014, the Uyghur American Association organized a demonstration in front of the Embassy of China in Washington, D.C. to commemorate the 17th anniversary of the Ghulja Massacre.

After the 2017 crack-down in Xinjiang, large numbers of Uyghurs released after serving long sentences due to participating in the incident have subsequently found themselves re-arrested and sentenced to long sentences or sent to the Xinjiang internment camps. Witnesses of the incident as well as family-members, friends, and associates have also been rounded up and imprisoned.

See also

List of massacres in China

References

1997 in China
1997 riots
Conflicts in 1997
20th century in Xinjiang
Protests in China
Massacres in China
East Turkestan independence movement
Protest-related deaths
Xinjiang conflict
Persecution of Uyghurs
Massacres committed by the People's Republic of China